The 2004 Ukrainian Amateur Cup  was the ninth annual season of Ukraine's football knockout competition for amateur football teams. The competition started on 31 July 2004 and concluded on 2 October 2004.

Competition schedule

First round (1/8)

Quarterfinals (1/4)
This year Haray Zhovkva, Pivdenstal Yenakieve, and ODEK Orzhiv received a bye to quarterfinals.

Semifinals (1/2)

Final

See also
 2004 Ukrainian Football Amateur League
 2004–05 Ukrainian Cup

External links
 2004 Ukrainian Amateur Cup at the Footpass (Football Federation of Ukraine)

2004
Amateur Cup
Ukrainian Amateur Cup